CMAS may stand for:

 Clinical Movement Analysis Society of the UK and Ireland 
CMAS (gene), the human enzyme cytidine monophosphate N-acetylneuraminic acid synthetase
 Center for Mexican American Studies, an academic research center at University of Texas at Arlington
 Commercial Mobile Alert System (now called Wireless Emergency Alerts), a system for distributing geo-targeted alerts to mobile devices
 Confédération Mondiale des Activités Subaquatiques, the international umbrella organization for underwater sports and recreational diving 
 CMAS* scuba diver and CMAS** scuba diver, diving certifications
 Coordination des Mouvements, Associations et Sympathisants, founded by Mahmoud Dicko
 “C-Mas”, CWCism for Christmas

See also
 CMA (disambiguation)